Kenneth Pack Toler (born April 9, 1959) is a former American football wide receiver in the National Football League who played for the New England Patriots. He played college football for the Ole Miss Rebels. He also played in the USFL for the Birmingham Stallions.

References

1959 births
Living people
American football wide receivers
New England Patriots players
Birmingham Stallions players
Ole Miss Rebels football players